Bishweshwar Nandi is an Indian gymnastics coach. He was also a prolific  gymnast himself. He was trained by Dalip Singh.  Nandi  had been five times National Champion in gymnastics, represented the country in 12 instances and led the Indian gymnastics team six times as captain.  He won Dronacharya Award in 2016 for his outstanding contribution to Indian gymnastics as a coach. Dipa Karmakar is one of the most successful students of Nandi. His wife, Soma Nandi, is also a gymnastics  coach.

Nandi was born in a Bengali family in Tripura, India.

See also 

 Gymnastics in India
 Dronacharya Award
 Tripura

References 

Indian male artistic gymnasts
Indian gymnastics coaches
Indian sports coaches
People from Tripura
Sportspeople from Tripura
Sportsmen from Tripura
Living people
Year of birth missing (living people)